Wheeler High School is a public high school in Fossil, Oregon, United States. It is in the Fossil School District, and competes jointly with Spray and Mitchell school as the Wheeler County Rattlers. When competing as the High School alone they are the Falcons

Academics
In 2008, 100 percent of the school's seniors received their high school diploma. Of six students, six graduated and none dropped out.

In 2021, 100 percent of the school's seniors dropped out. The school's only student dropped out.

Fossil Beds
Wheeler High School also contains fossil beds containing fossils of plants like sycamore, maples, oaks, roses, and alder from the Oligocene (33 million years ago) and they are open to the public including fossil collecting.

References

High schools in Wheeler County, Oregon
Education in Wheeler County, Oregon
Public middle schools in Oregon
Educational institutions established in 1901
Public high schools in Oregon
Charter schools in Oregon
1901 establishments in Oregon